Lake Brompton is a lake located in the watershed of the St-François River, in the Estrie region of Quebec, Canada. It's watershed covers an area of ​​approximately 140 km2. The lake has a length of just over 12 km, varies in width from about ½ to 2 km. Its deepest place is 42 meters, but the average depth is 11 meters. 

It is located partially in the Regional County Municipalities of Le Val-Saint-François and Memphrémagog.

When the Iroquois forced them from the Lake Ontario region, the Wendat migrated to Quebec. While many ended up in the Quebec City region, some settled at the source of the current Salmon River, near Lake Brompton then known as Antoke Outunwitti.

Lake Brompton is said to be home to the Lake Brompton Monster, sometimes nicknamed Champ's younger brother.

The Islands

References

External links

Lakes of Estrie